Borgo Santa Rita is a village in Tuscany, central Italy,  administratively a frazione of the comune of Cinigiano, province of Grosseto. At the time of the 2001 census its population amounted to 34.

Borgo Santa Rita is about 33 km from Grosseto and 10 km from Cinigiano. It is situated along the provincial road which links the Grosseto-Siena highway to the Mount Amiata.

History 
The whole territory was property of the counts of Poggio alle Mura (Montalcino) during the Middle Ages, but the modern village is born as a result of the Maremman Riforma agraria (land reform) in the early 1960s.

Main sights 
 Santa Petronilla (20th century), main parish church of the village, it was built in 1964 and designed by architect Carlo Boccianti.
 Chapel of Santa Petronilla, early church dating back to the Middle Ages, it's now in ruins.

References

Bibliography 
 Antonio Valentino Simoncelli, Bonifiche nel Grossetano: percorso storico dal 1200 a oggi, Roccastrada, 2008.

See also 
 Castiglioncello Bandini
 Monticello Amiata
 Poggi del Sasso
 Porrona
 Sasso d'Ombrone

Frazioni of Cinigiano